The Treaty of Bucharest was concluded on 10 August 1913, by the delegates of Bulgaria, Romania, Serbia, Montenegro and Greece. The Treaty was concluded in the aftermath of the Second Balkan War and amended the previous Treaty of London, which ended the First Balkan War. About one month later, the Bulgarians signed a separate border treaty (the Treaty of Constantinople) with the Ottomans, who had regained some territory west of the Enos-Midia Line during the second war.

Background

Bulgaria, dissatisfied with its gains in the First Balkan War, and especially with Greek and Serbian gains in Macedonia, launched an attack on its former allies in June 1913. The attacks were driven back, and the Greek and Serbian armies invaded Bulgarian-held territory in return. At the same time, the Ottomans advanced into Eastern Thrace and retook Adrianople, while Romania used the opportunity to invade Bulgaria from the north and advance against little opposition to within a short distance of the Bulgarian capital, Sofia. Isolated and surrounded by a more powerful coalition of opponents, Bulgaria was forced to agree to a truce and to peace negotiations to be held in the Romanian capital, Bucharest.

All important arrangements and concessions involving the rectification of the controverted international boundary lines were perfected in a series of committee meetings, incorporated in separate protocols, and formally ratified by subsequent action of the general assembly of delegates. Although the Ottomans had also participated in the Second Balkan War, they were not represented at this treaty. Instead, bilateral treaties were later concluded with Bulgaria (Treaty of Constantinople) and Greece (Treaty of Athens).

Gains in territory

Serbia 
The eastern frontier of Serbia was drawn from the summit of Patarika, on the old frontier, and followed the watershed between the Vardar and the Struma rivers to the Greek-Bulgarian boundary, except that the upper valley of the Strumica remained in the possession of Bulgaria. The territory thus obtained by Serbia engulfed central Vardar Macedonia, including "Ochrida, Monastir, Kosovo, Istib, and Kotchana, and the eastern half of the Sanjak of Novi-Pazar". These territories would today include Novi Pazar in Serbia, the disputed territory of Kosovo, and Ohrid, Štip, Kočani and Bitola in present-day North Macedonia.

Greece 
The boundary line separating Greece from Bulgaria was drawn from the crest of Belasica to the mouth of the Mesta (Nestos), on the Aegean Sea.

The territory thus gained included large parts of Epirus and Macedonia, including Thessaloniki. The Greek-Bulgarian border was moved eastwards to beyond Kavala, thus restricting the Aegean seaboard of Bulgaria to an inconsiderable extent of 110 km, with only Dedeagach (modern Alexandroupoli) as a seaport. Within this region was also Florina. In addition, Crete was definitively assigned to Greece and was formally taken over on 14 December that year.

Bulgaria 

Bulgaria's share of the spoils, although greatly reduced, was not entirely negligible.

In addition, Bulgaria agreed to dismantle all existing fortresses and bound itself not to construct forts at Rousse or Shumen or in any of the territory between these two cities, or within a radius of 20 kilometers around Balchik.

Romania 

Montenegro 
The treaty awarded the regions of Berane, Ipek and Gjakova to Montenegro.

Perception
According to Anderson and Hershey, the severe terms imposed on Bulgaria contrasted the ambitions of its government upon the entry into the Balkan War: the territory eventually gained was relatively circumscribed; Bulgaria had failed to gain Macedonia, which, with its large population of ethnic Bulgarians, was Sofia's avowed purpose in entering the war, and especially the districts of Ohrid and Bitola, which had been a main demand. With only a small outlet to the Aegean around the minor port of Dedeagach, the country had to abandon its project of Balkan hegemony.

According to Anderson and Hershey, Greece, though a winner and triumphant after the acquisition of Thessaloniki and most of Macedonia up to and including the port of Kavala, still had outstanding issues. Italy was opposed to Greek claims to Northern Epirus, and controlled the Greek-inhabited Dodecanese islands. In addition, the status quo of the islands of the Northeastern Aegean, which Greece had taken from the Ottomans, remained undetermined until February 1914, when the Great Powers recognized Greek sovereignty over them. Tensions with the Ottomans remained high, however, in the face of persecutions of Anatolian Greeks, leading to a crisis and a naval race in summer 1914 that was stopped only by the outbreak of World War I. At the end of the war, Greece still had claims to territories inhabited, at the time, by some 3 million Greeks.

Rise of Romania as a regional power 
Following the Second Balkan War, in which Romania's intervention proved decisive, and the subsequent 1913 Treaty of Bucharest, Romania's dominant position in Southeastern Europe was confirmed. Romania also gained Southern Dobruja from Bulgaria. Romania also raised the question of the Balkan Vlachs, whom it considered its compatriots. Too distant to be annexed, however, Romania took Southern Dobruja as compensation. Romania was the strongest nation in the Balkans, and thus it believed that it had to acquire territory, given that its neighbors were being aggrandized. Romania's argument that it had turned the scales of the war was accepted without serious objections, due in part to Bulgaria's attitude not attracting much compassion. Despite not annexing the areas inhabited by Balkan Vlachs, Romania nevertheless obtained protection of the schools and churches of the Vlachs in the other Balkan states. Thus, Romania was the only Balkan country to obtain guarantees from all three of its neighbors, which pledged to recognize its interest in, and respect the autonomy of the Balkan Vlachs. The status of the Vlachs in Bulgarian territories was settled on 4 August, in Greek territories on 5 August and in Serbian territories between 5 and 7 August. The 1913 Treaty of Bucharest itself was signed on 10 August. One notable aspect of this treaty was the lack of any real involvement from the European Great Powers. The Balkan states hurried to settle their differences before the Great Powers could again intervene in their affairs. That's not to say, however, that the treaty went unnoticed, but the reactions among the Great Powers were mixed: there were rumblings from the capitals of Germany, Austria-Hungary and Russia, while the British and the French rejoiced in the "coming of age" of the Balkan states. The Great Powers did not revise the treaty. Overall, the six Powers of the Concert of Europe had proved themselves to be rather helpless in Balkan crises. They had been unable to prevent the wars and subsequently could not ignore their results. The idea of revising the 1913 Treaty of Bucharest had to be abandoned.

Subsequently, in 1914, Romania managed to impose its candidate for the throne of the Principality of Albania and support his reign by deploying military forces up to a battalion in strength. Romania's brief stint as a significant power thus started with the 1913 Treaty of Bucharest, but ended in October 1916. Having joined the First World War on the side of the Allies on 27 August 1916, Romania launched an invasion of Transylvania. However, by 16 October, Transylvania had been cleared of Romanian troops. One week later, on 23 October, Romania's chief seaport was captured by the Central Powers.

References

Sources

Further reading
 
 
 

Austria-Hungary in World War I
20th century in Bucharest
History of Greece (1909–1924)
Macedonia under the Ottoman Empire
Treaties of the Ottoman Empire
1913 in Bulgaria
1913 in Greece
1913 in Romania
Vardar Macedonia (1912–1918)
Treaties concluded in 1913
Treaties involving territorial changes
Treaties of the Kingdom of Romania
Peace treaties of Romania
Treaties of the Kingdom of Bulgaria
Treaties of the Kingdom of Greece
Treaties of the Kingdom of Serbia
Treaties of the Kingdom of Montenegro
Peace treaties of Bulgaria
Second Balkan War
Bulgaria–Romania relations
Bulgaria–Greece relations
Greece–Serbia relations
Montenegro–Serbia relations
Diplomatic conferences in Romania
Peace treaties of Serbia
Peace treaties of Greece
Greece–Romania relations
1913 in Serbia
August 1913 events
20th-century military history of Montenegro
Territorial evolution of Romania
Bulgaria–Serbia relations